Horner House and Barn, also known as Alexander Horner House and Locust Grive Farm, is a historic home and barn located at Cumberland Township, Adams County, Pennsylvania. The house was built in 1819, and is a -story, five-bay vernacular Federal style dwelling.  It has a main block and rear ell, and sits on an uncut fieldstone foundation.  The bank barn was built in 1840. The barn has two levels and measures .  Also on the property is a contributing equipment barn, built in 1916, and an early 19th-century detached summer kitchen.

It was listed on the National Register of Historic Places in 2007.

References

Houses on the National Register of Historic Places in Pennsylvania
Houses completed in 1819
Infrastructure completed in 1840
Federal architecture in Pennsylvania
Houses in Adams County, Pennsylvania
National Register of Historic Places in Adams County, Pennsylvania